Kurtalan railway station is the easternmost railway station in Siirt Province, Turkey. It is also the eastern terminus of the Southern Kurtalan Express which connects Ankara and Kurtalan.

Kurtalan station was opened in 1944 by the Turkish State Railways. The station was built as part of the railway from Diyarbakır to the Iranian border, via Tatvan and Van, which began in 1937. The railway reached Kurtalan in 1940, but due to the mountainous terrain around Lake Van, the route to Van was altered to begin at Elazığ, leaving Kurtalan as the eastern terminus of the railway. In 2017 the State Railways began planning a  extension east to the provincial capital, Siirt.

TCDD Taşımacılık operates a daily intercity train to Ankara. (temporarily Irmak)

References

External links
Kurtalan station information
Kurtalan station timetable

Railway stations in Siirt Province
Railway stations opened in 1944
1944 establishments in Turkey